1457 Ankara, provisional designation , is a stony asteroid from the central region of the asteroid belt, approximately 18 kilometers in diameter. It was discovered on 3 August 1937, by German astronomer Karl Reinmuth at Heidelberg Observatory in southwest Germany, and later named for the Turkish capital city of Ankara.

Orbit and classification 

Ankara orbits the Sun in the middle of the main-belt at a distance of 2.3–3.1 AU once every 4 years and 5 months (1,618 days). Its orbit has an eccentricity of 0.15 and an inclination of 6° with respect to the ecliptic.

Physical characteristics

Rotation period 

A rotational lightcurve of Ankara was obtained from photometric observations by French amateur astronomer René Roy in September 2004. Lightcurve analysis gave a rotation period of 31.8 hours with a brightness variation of 0.21 magnitude. While not being a slow rotator, Ankaras spin rate is slower than that of most asteroids, which typically rotate within 20 hours once around their axis.

Diameter and albedo 

According to the surveys carried out by the Japanese Akari satellite, and NASA's Wide-field Infrared Survey Explorer with its subsequent NEOWISE mission, Ankara measures between 17.834 and 19.82 kilometers in diameter and its surface has an albedo between 0.258 and 0.320.

The Collaborative Asteroid Lightcurve Link (CALL) assumes a lower albedo of 0.10 – a compromise value that lies between the albedos for stony (0.20) and carbonaceous (0.057) asteroids, chosen by CALL for all non-family asteroids with a semi-major axis between 2.6 and 2.7 AU – and consequently calculates a larger diameter of 29.08 kilometers with an absolute magnitude of 10.8, as a body's diameter and albedo are inversely related to each other.

Naming 

This minor planet was named after the Turkish capital Ankara. The official naming citation was proposed by Wolfgang Gleißberg, a German Solar astronomer, who immigrated to Turkey, after he was dismissed at the Breslau Observatory in Nazi Germany in 1933, because he had a Jewish grandfather. The citation was first mentioned in The Names of the Minor Planets by Paul Herget in 1955.

References

External links 
 Asteroid Lightcurve Database (LCDB), query form (info )
 Dictionary of Minor Planet Names, Google books
 Asteroids and comets rotation curves, CdR – Observatoire de Genève, Raoul Behrend
 Discovery Circumstances: Numbered Minor Planets (1)-(5000) – Minor Planet Center
 
 

001457
Discoveries by Karl Wilhelm Reinmuth
Named minor planets
19370803